Fiona Brown (born 1985)
is a World and European champion bridge player.

Bridge accomplishments

Wins
 European Women Teams Championship (2), 2012, 2016
 World Bridge Games (2), 2012, 2018

Runners-up
 Venice Cup (2), 2013, 2017
 European Women Teams Championship (1), 2014

References

External links
 
 

Australian contract bridge players
Living people
1985 births